Ceratostylis is a genus of orchids with more than 140 species distributed in China, India, Southeast Asia, New Guinea, the Philippines, and Melanesia.

List of species 

Ceratostylis acutifolia Schltr., Repert. Spec. Nov. Regni Veg. Beih. 1: 254 (1912). 
Ceratostylis acutilabris J.J.Sm., Meded. Rijks-Herb. 23: 6 (1915). 
Ceratostylis alata Carr, Gard. Bull. Straits Settlem. 8: 93 (1935). 
Ceratostylis alberteduardi P.Royen, Alp. Fl. New Guinea 2: 464 (1979). 
Ceratostylis albiflora J.J.Sm., Bull. Dép. Agric. Indes Néerl. 19: 11 (1908). 
Ceratostylis alpina J.J.Sm., Bull. Jard. Bot. Buitenzorg, II, 13: 62 (1914). 
Ceratostylis alticola P.Royen, Alp. Fl. New Guinea 2: 480 (1979). 
Ceratostylis ampullacea Kraenzl., Bot. Jahrb. Syst. 17: 487 (1893). 
Ceratostylis anceps Blume, Bijdr.: 305 (1825). 
Ceratostylis angiensis J.J.Sm. in L.S.Gibbs, Fl. Arfak Mts.: 116 (1917). 
Ceratostylis angustifolia Ridl., J. Fed. Malay States Mus. 8(4): 104 (1917). 
Ceratostylis anjasmorensis J.J.Wood & J.B.Comber, Kew Bull. 41: 697 (1986). 
Ceratostylis arfakensis J.J.Sm., Repert. Spec. Nov. Regni Veg. 12: 394 (1913). 
Ceratostylis armeria Ridl., Trans. Linn. Soc. London, Bot. 9: 192 (1916). 
Ceratostylis backeri J.J.Sm., Bull. Jard. Bot. Buitenzorg, II, 9: 52 (1913). 
Ceratostylis baliensis J.J.Sm., Bull. Jard. Bot. Buitenzorg, III, 9: 147 (1927). 
Ceratostylis borneensis J.J.Sm., Mitt. Inst. Allg. Bot. Hamburg 7: 45 (1927). 
Ceratostylis braccata Rchb.f., Bonplandia (Hannover) 5: 53 (1857). 
Ceratostylis brachyphylla Schltr., Bot. Jahrb. Syst. 58: 73 (1922). 
Ceratostylis brevibrachiata J.J.Sm., Bull. Dép. Agric. Indes Néerl. 43: 38 (1910). 
Ceratostylis breviceps Ridl., Trans. Linn. Soc. London, Bot. 9: 193 (1916). 
Ceratostylis breviclavata J.J.Sm., Nova Guinea 18: 29 (1935). 
Ceratostylis brevicostata J.J.Sm., Bull. Jard. Bot. Buitenzorg, III, 10: 55 (1928). 
Ceratostylis brevipes Schltr., Repert. Spec. Nov. Regni Veg. Beih. 1: 246 (1912). 
Ceratostylis bulbophylli Schltr., Bot. Jahrb. Syst. 58: 70 (1922). 
Ceratostylis caespitosa L.O.Williams, Bot. Mus. Leafl. 6: 96 (1938). 
Ceratostylis calcarata Schltr., Repert. Spec. Nov. Regni Veg. Beih. 1: 251 (1912). 
Ceratostylis calceiformis R.S.Rogers, Trans. & Proc. Roy. Soc. South Australia 49: 257 (1925). 
Ceratostylis capitata Zoll. & Moritzi, Natuur- Geneesk. Arch. Ned.-Indië 1: 404 (1844). 
Ceratostylis cebolleta J.J.Sm., Bull. Jard. Bot. Buitenzorg, II, 25: 28 (1917). 
Ceratostylis ciliolata J.J.Sm., Repert. Spec. Nov. Regni Veg. 11: 275 (1912). 
Ceratostylis clathrata Hook.f., Fl. Brit. India 5: 825 (1890). 
Ceratostylis clavata J.J.Sm., Bull. Dép. Agric. Indes Néerl. 19: 11 (1908). 
Ceratostylis compressicaulis J.J.Sm., Bot. Jahrb. Syst. 66: 173 (1934). 
Ceratostylis crassifolia J.J.Sm., Bull. Jard. Bot. Buitenzorg, II, 9: 54 (1913). 
Ceratostylis crassilingua Ames & C.Schweinf. in O.Ames, Orchidaceae 6: 135 (1920). 
Ceratostylis crassipetala J.J.Sm., Bull. Jard. Bot. Buitenzorg, III, 2: 39 (1920). 
Ceratostylis culminicola P.Royen, Alp. Fl. New Guinea 2: 457 (1979). 
Ceratostylis curvimentum J.J.Sm., Bot. Jahrb. Syst. 66: 172 (1934). 
Ceratostylis dataensis Ames, Orchidaceae 7: 151 (1922). 
Ceratostylis dischorensis Schltr., Repert. Spec. Nov. Regni Veg. Beih. 1: 243 (1912). 
Ceratostylis elmeri Ames, Schedul. Orchid. 6: 49 (1923). 
Ceratostylis eria Govaerts, World Checklist Seed Pl. 3(1): 13 (1999). 
Ceratostylis evrardii Gagnep., Bull. Soc. Bot. France 79: 33 (1932). 
Ceratostylis ficinioides Schltr., Repert. Spec. Nov. Regni Veg. Beih. 1: 247 (1912). 
Ceratostylis flavescens Schltr., Repert. Spec. Nov. Regni Veg. Beih. 1: 244 (1912). 
Ceratostylis formicifera J.J.Sm., Bull. Dép. Agric. Indes Néerl. 39: 5 (1910). 
Ceratostylis glabra Ridl., Trans. Linn. Soc. London, Bot. 9: 193 (1916). 
Ceratostylis glabriflora Schltr., Repert. Spec. Nov. Regni Veg. Beih. 1: 253 (1912). 
Ceratostylis gracilicaulis Schltr., Bot. Jahrb. Syst. 58: 71 (1922). 
Ceratostylis gracilis Blume, Bijdr.: 306 (1825). 
Ceratostylis graminea Blume, Bijdr.: 305 (1825). 
Ceratostylis grandiflora J.J.Sm., Recueil Trav. Bot. Néerl. 1: 156 (1904). 
Ceratostylis hainanensis Z.H.Tsi, Acta Phytotax. Sin. 33: 582 (1995). 
Ceratostylis heleocharis Schltr., Bot. Jahrb. Syst. 58: 74 (1922). 
Ceratostylis himalaica Hook.f., Fl. Brit. India 5: 826 (1890). 
Ceratostylis humilis J.J.Sm., Bull. Dép. Agric. Indes Néerl. 19: 11 (1908). 
Ceratostylis hydrophila Schltr., Repert. Spec. Nov. Regni Veg. Beih. 1: 252 (1912). 
Ceratostylis incognita J.T.Atwood & Beckner, Selbyana 19: 265 (1998 publ. 1999). 
Ceratostylis indifferens J.J.Sm., Bull. Dép. Agric. Indes Néerl. 39: 6 (1910). 
Ceratostylis inflata Schltr., Repert. Spec. Nov. Regni Veg. Beih. 1: 248 (1912). 
Ceratostylis jacobsonii J.J.Sm., Bull. Jard. Bot. Buitenzorg, III, 2: 40 (1920). 
Ceratostylis juncoides Schltr., Bot. Jahrb. Syst. 58: 75 (1922). 
Ceratostylis kaniensis Schltr., Repert. Spec. Nov. Regni Veg. Beih. 1: 245 (1912). 
Ceratostylis kerigomnensis P.Royen, Alp. Fl. New Guinea 2: 466 (1979). 
Ceratostylis keysseri Schltr., Repert. Spec. Nov. Regni Veg. 16: 214 (1919). 
Ceratostylis lancifolia Hook.f., Fl. Brit. India 5: 826 (1890). 
Ceratostylis lancipetala Schltr., Repert. Spec. Nov. Regni Veg. Beih. 1: 246 (1912). 
Ceratostylis lateralis Schltr., Bot. Jahrb. Syst. 45(104): 20 (1911). 
Ceratostylis latifolia Blume, Bijdr.: 305 (1825). 
Ceratostylis latipetala Ames, Philipp. J. Sci., C 4: 671 (1910). 
Ceratostylis latuensis J.J.Sm., Orch. Ambon: 37 (1905). 
Ceratostylis leucantha Schltr., Bot. Jahrb. Syst. 45(104): 21 (1911). 
Ceratostylis loheri L.O.Williams, Bot. Mus. Leafl. 6: 97 (1938). 
Ceratostylis lombasangensis J.J.Sm., Bull. Jard. Bot. Buitenzorg, III, 10: 13 (1928). 
Ceratostylis longicaulis J.J.Sm., Repert. Spec. Nov. Regni Veg. 11: 275 (1912). 
Ceratostylis longifolia J.J.Sm., Bull. Dép. Agric. Indes Néerl. 39: 6 (1910). 
Ceratostylis longipedunculata J.J.Sm., Meded. Rijks-Herb. 53: 6 (1925). 
Ceratostylis longipes Schltr., Repert. Spec. Nov. Regni Veg. Beih. 1: 250 (1912). 
Ceratostylis longisegmenta Ames & C.Schweinf. in O.Ames, Orchidaceae 6: 136 (1920). 
Ceratostylis maboroensis Schltr., Repert. Spec. Nov. Regni Veg. Beih. 1: 256 (1912). 
Ceratostylis macra J.J.Sm., Nova Guinea 18: 30 (1935). 
Ceratostylis malintangensis J.J.Sm., Bull. Jard. Bot. Buitenzorg, III, 9: 148 (1927). 
Ceratostylis mamberamensis J.J.Sm., Nova Guinea 14: 384 (1929). 
Ceratostylis mayrii J.J.Sm., Bot. Jahrb. Syst. 66: 171 (1934). 
Ceratostylis micrantha Schltr., Bot. Jahrb. Syst. 39: 63 (1906). 
Ceratostylis mindanaensis Ames, Schedul. Orchid. 6: 51 (1923). 
Ceratostylis minutiflora Schltr., Repert. Spec. Nov. Regni Veg. 16: 46 (1919). 
Ceratostylis muscicola J.J.Sm., Nova Guinea 14: 387 (1929). 
Ceratostylis nalbesiensis J.J.Sm., Bull. Jard. Bot. Buitenzorg, III, 9: 461 (1928). 
Ceratostylis nivea Schltr., Repert. Spec. Nov. Regni Veg. Beih. 1: 244 (1912). 
Ceratostylis obscureviolacea Gilli, Ann. Naturhist. Mus. Wien, B 84: 21 (1980 publ. 1983). 
Ceratostylis oreophila Schltr., Repert. Spec. Nov. Regni Veg. Beih. 1: 248 (1912). 
Ceratostylis ovatilabris J.J.Sm., Nova Guinea 14: 386 (1929). 
Ceratostylis parciflora J.J.Sm., Meded. Rijks-Herb. 23: 7 (1915). 
Ceratostylis parvifolia J.J.Sm., Bull. Jard. Bot. Buitenzorg, II, 25: 30 (1917). 
Ceratostylis pendula Hook.f., Fl. Brit. India 5: 809 (1890). 
Ceratostylis phaeochlamys Schltr., Repert. Spec. Nov. Regni Veg. Beih. 1: 249 (1912). 
Ceratostylis philippinensis Rolfe ex Ames, Orchidaceae 1: 79 (1905). 
Ceratostylis piepersii J.J.Sm., Bull. Jard. Bot. Buitenzorg, II, 3: 58 (1912). 
Ceratostylis pinguis Schltr., Bot. Jahrb. Syst. 58: 72 (1922). 
Ceratostylis platychila Schltr. in K.M.Schumann & C.A.G.Lauterbach, Fl. Schutzgeb. Südsee, Nachtr.: 138 (1905). 
Ceratostylis pleurothallis (C.S.P.Parish & Rchb.f.) Seidenf., Opera Bot. 62: 44 (1982). 
Ceratostylis pugioniformis J.J.Sm., Bull. Dép. Agric. Indes Néerl. 19: 12 (1908). 
Ceratostylis pulchella Holttum, Gard. Bull. Singapore 14: 4 (1953). 
Ceratostylis puncticulata Ridl., J. Straits Branch Roy. Asiat. Soc. 39: 79 (1903). 
Ceratostylis radiata J.J.Sm., Orch. Java: 295 (1905). 
Ceratostylis ramosa Ames & Rolfe in O.Ames, Orchidaceae 2: 149 (1908). 
Ceratostylis recurva J.J.Sm., Bull. Dép. Agric. Indes Néerl. 39: 6 (1910). 
Ceratostylis resiana J.J.Sm., Bull. Dép. Agric. Indes Néerl. 19: 12 (1908). 
Ceratostylis retisquama Rchb.f., Bonplandia (Hannover) 5: 53 (1857). 
Ceratostylis rivularis Schltr., Repert. Spec. Nov. Regni Veg. Beih. 1: 250 (1912). 
Ceratostylis robusta Hook.f., Fl. Brit. India 5: 827 (1890). 
Ceratostylis rubra Ames, Philipp. J. Sci., C 4: 670 (1910). 
Ceratostylis sacculata J.J.Sm., Nova Guinea 14: 385 (1929). 
Ceratostylis sarcostomatoides J.J.Sm., Bull. Jard. Bot. Buitenzorg, III, 9: 150 (1927). 
Ceratostylis sayeri Schltr., Repert. Spec. Nov. Regni Veg. 9: 27 (1910). 
Ceratostylis scariosa Ridl., J. Malayan Branch Roy. Asiat. Soc. 1: 96 (1923). 
Ceratostylis scirpoides Schltr. in K.M.Schumann & C.A.G.Lauterbach, Fl. Schutzgeb. Südsee, Nachtr.: 138 (1905). 
Ceratostylis selebensis J.J.Sm., Bot. Jahrb. Syst. 65: 475 (1933). 
Ceratostylis senilis Rchb.f., Otia Bot. Hamburg.: 54 (1878). 
Ceratostylis sessilis J.J.Sm., Bull. Jard. Bot. Buitenzorg, II, 2: 7 (1911). 
Ceratostylis siamensis Rolfe ex Downie, Bull. Misc. Inform. Kew 1925: 379 (1925). 
Ceratostylis sima J.J.Sm., Bull. Dép. Agric. Indes Néerl. 15: 9 (1908). 
Ceratostylis simplex Blume, Bijdr.: 305 (1825). 
Ceratostylis spathulata Schltr. in K.M.Schumann & C.A.G.Lauterbach, Fl. Schutzgeb. Südsee, Nachtr.: 139 (1905). 
Ceratostylis sphaerocephala Schltr., Bot. Jahrb. Syst. 58: 71 (1922). 
Ceratostylis steenisii J.J.Sm., Blumea 5: 307 (1943). 
Ceratostylis subcoerulea P.Royen, Alp. Fl. New Guinea 2: 473 (1979). 
Ceratostylis subulata Blume, Bijdr.: 306 (1825). 
Ceratostylis succulenta J.J.Sm., Bull. Jard. Bot. Buitenzorg, III, 9: 151 (1927). 
Ceratostylis tenericaulis Ridl., Trans. Linn. Soc. London, Bot. 9: 192 (1916). 
Ceratostylis tenuis Schltr., Bot. Jahrb. Syst. 58: 74 (1922). 
Ceratostylis tetrarioides Schltr., Bot. Jahrb. Syst. 58: 72 (1922). 
Ceratostylis thailandica Seidenf., Bot. Tidsskr. 65: 134 (1969). 
Ceratostylis tjihana J.J.Sm., Bull. Dép. Agric. Indes Néerl. 45: 13 (1911). 
Ceratostylis todjambuensis J.J.Sm., Bot. Jahrb. Syst. 65: 474 (1933). 
Ceratostylis tonkinensis (Gagnep.) Aver., Bot. Zhurn. (Moscow & Leningrad) 73: 107 (1988). 
Ceratostylis tricallifera J.J.Sm., Bull. Jard. Bot. Buitenzorg, III, 2: 41 (1920). 
Ceratostylis triloba Schltr., Repert. Spec. Nov. Regni Veg. Beih. 1: 254 (1912). 
Ceratostylis trinodis J.J.Sm., Bull. Dép. Agric. Indes Néerl. 45: 14 (1911). 
Ceratostylis truncata J.J.Sm., Bull. Jard. Bot. Buitenzorg, III, 9: 149 (1927). 
Ceratostylis vagans Schltr., Repert. Spec. Nov. Regni Veg. 10: 67 (1911). 
Ceratostylis vonroemeri J.J.Sm., Nova Guinea 12: 32 (1913). 
Ceratostylis wenzelii Ames, Philipp. J. Sci., C 8: 421 (1913 publ. 1914).

References

External links 

Podochileae genera
Eriinae